Brigadier General Frederic Bates Butler (October 5, 1896 – June 20, 1987) was the US Army officer who led the American Task Force in the encirclement action of Operation Dragoon at the Battle of Montelimar, France in August 1944.

Personal life
He was born in San Francisco, California, the son of Vincent Butler and Mary Flynn. On November 12, 1924 he married Philippi Harriette Harding (a US citizen born Chicago, Illinois; died April 12, 1984, San Francisco, California) in Tientain, China. The couple had two daughters, Phillipa "Popsy" Butler (born 1935) and Patricia M. Butler (born 1927), and one son Bill Butler (born August 28, 1928).

Education
Butler was educated at St. Ignatius College Preparatory, a Jesuit school in San Francisco. He was a cadet at the United States Military Academy at West Point, New York, from June 15, 1916 to November 1, 1918.

Army career
On graduation he was promoted in the Army to Second Lieutenant, Corps of Engineers. He served at Camp A. A. Humphreys in Virginia, as student officer at Engineer School, from December 2, 1918 to June 1919. Butler was sent to France with American Expeditionary Forces, on a tour of observation, to September 1919.  He graduated from Camp A. A. Humphreys to the United States Army Engineer School in 1921. 

Butler served in China and Outer Mongolia with the Army Corps of Engineers and taught at West Point before returning to San Francisco in 1927. Still in service, he worked on Treasure Island for the 1939–40 Golden Gate International Exposition and supervised roadwork on nearby Yerba Buena Island. After the fair ended, Treasure Island was sold to the U.S. Navy to become the base of operations for the war in the Pacific Theatre.

In World War II, he was involved in both the African campaign as G-3 in the Advance Headquarters, II Corps, in Tunisia 1943, in Italy being promoted Colonel commander 168th Infantry Regiment and the invasion of Southern France, where as Brigadier General in VI Corps he led Task Force Butler into the Battle of Montelimar.

After the war he served as manager of the San Francisco International Airport and as a commissioner for the San Francisco Fire Department. He served as commander of Camp McCoy May 24, 1951 through February 6, 1952. He retired from the Army in 1953.

He died in San Francisco on June 20, 1987.

Awards and medals
 Distinguished Service Cross
 Legion of Merit, the Oak Leaf Cluster
 Bronze Star 
 Purple Heart
 France honored him with the Croix de Guerre and the Legion of Honor
 Italy awarded him the Cross of Valor
 Knight of the Sovereign Military Order of Malta, 1962

Promotions
 Second Lieutenant November 1, 1918
 First Lieutenant May 7, 1919
 Captain November 1, 1934
 Major July 1, 1940
 Lieutenant Colonel September 15, 1941, accepted September 22, 1941
 Colonel February 1, 1942
 Brigadier General January 17, 1944

Notes

References

External links
Generals of World War II

1896 births
1987 deaths
United States Army generals of World War II
United States Army generals
United States Army personnel of World War I
United States Military Academy alumni
People from San Francisco
Recipients of the Distinguished Service Cross (United States)
Recipients of the Legion of Merit
Recipients of the Cross of Valour (Poland)
Military personnel from California